Rafael Romero Barros (30 May 1832, Moguer - 2 December 1895, Córdoba) was a Spanish painter who often worked in the Costumbrismo style. His youngest son was the painter Julio Romero de Torres.

Biography

He was born into a humble working-class family. When he was only a few months old, his parents moved to Seville to find employment. At the age of twelve, he began to study at the "Universidad Literaria de Sevilla", where he showed some talent as a writer, producing works on art and literature. It was also there that he had his first art lessons and became serious about an artistic career. Raphael and the English landscape painters were among his first influences.

In 1862, he moved to Córdoba to manage the "Museo Provincial de Pintura". Over the next few years, he founded the "Escuela de Música" and the "Escuela Provincial de Bellas Artes". He also organized and directed the "" and remained active as an author, contributing prolifically to the local newspapers and magazines. In addition to his cultural work, he was a lifetime member of the "Asociación de Obreros Cordobeses", a labor union, where he served as secretary.

Equally significant, perhaps, was his work as an art restorer. In his museum workshop, he restored paintings by Juan de Valdés Leal, Antonio del Castillo y Saavedra and many others, including the image of the "Virgen de Linares", from the Thirteenth Century. His interest in archaeology naturally led him to work for preservation as well as restoration. He was especially concerned about works of Arab and Jewish origin, which were being ignored or vandalized, so he formed an alliance with Father Fidel Fita, a distinguished historical scholar who helped him with transcriptions. His efforts were crowned by an appointment to a seat on the "Comisión de Monumentos de Córdoba".

Selected paintings
His works, especially the later canvases, are classified as Costumbrista, although they often lack the anecdotal character typical of the genre. Many show the influence of Bartolomé Esteban Murillo.

References

Further reading 
 Mercedes Valverde Candil, Rafael Romero Barros, Archivo Histórico Municipal; Fundación Municipal Cultura, Moguer, 1990.
 Mercedes Mudarra Barrero, Rafael Romero Barros, Vida y Obra (1832-1895). 1996 
 Pablo Rodriguez-Torices Arroyo, Rafael Romero y Barros, Archivo Histórico Municipal; Fundación Municipal Cultura, Moguer, 2010.

External links 

 Works by Rafael Romero Barros @ Ciudad de la Pintura.
 Books by Rafael Romero Barros @  Biblioteca Virtual Miguel de Cervantes

1832 births
1895 deaths
19th-century Spanish painters
19th-century Spanish male artists
Spanish male painters
Landscape painters
Orientalist painters
People from the Province of Huelva